Chondropoma auberianum is a species of an operculate land snail, terrestrial gastropod mollusk in the family Pomatiidae.

Distribution 
This species lives in Cuba.

Ecology 
Chondropoma auberianum is a tree dwelling species.

Predators of Chondropoma auberianum include larvae of firefly bug Alecton discoidalis.

References

Pomatiidae
Gastropods described in 1842
Endemic fauna of Cuba